The Zoological Society of London (ZSL) is a charity devoted to the worldwide conservation of animals and their habitats. It was founded in 1826. Since 1828, it has maintained the London Zoo, and since 1931 Whipsnade Park.

History

On 29 November 1822, the birthday of John Ray, "the father of modern zoology", a meeting held in the Linnean Society in Soho Square led by Rev. William Kirby, resolved to form a "Zoological Club of the Linnean Society of London". Between 1816 and 1826, discussions between Stamford Raffles, Humphry Davy, Joseph Banks and others led to the idea that London should have an establishment similar to the Jardin des Plantes in Paris. It would house a zoological collection "which should interest and amuse the public."
 

The society was founded in April 1826 by Sir Stamford Raffles, the Marquess of Lansdowne, Lord Auckland, Sir Humphry Davy, Robert Peel, Joseph Sabine, Nicholas Aylward Vigors along with various other nobility, clergy, and naturalists. Raffles was the first chairman and president, but died after only a few months in office, in July 1826. He was succeeded by the Marquess of Lansdowne who supervised the building of the first animal houses, a parcel of land in Regent's Park having already been obtained from the Crown at the inaugural meeting. It received a Royal Charter from George IV on 27 March 1829.

The purpose of the society was to create a collection of animals for study at leisure, an associated museum and library. In April 1828, the Zoological Gardens were opened to members. In 1831 William IV presented the Royal Menagerie to the Zoological Society, and in 1847 the public was admitted to aid funding, and Londoners soon christened the Zoological Gardens the "Zoo". London Zoo soon had the most extensive collection of animals in the world.

A History of the ZSL, written by Henry Scherren (FZS), was published in 1905. The History was criticised as inadequately researched by Peter Chalmers Mitchell in 1929; both histories were labelled inaccurate by John Bastin in 1970.

As the twentieth century began, the need to maintain and research large animals in a more natural environment became clear. In 1926, profiting from the agricultural depression, the ideal place was found: Hall Farm, near Whipsnade village, was derelict, and held almost  on the Chiltern Hills. ZSL bought the farm in December 1926 for £13,480 12s 10d. In 1928 the first animals arrived at the new Whipsnade Park—two Amherst pheasants, a golden pheasant and five red jungle fowl. Others soon followed, including muntjac deer, llamas, wombats and skunks. In 1931 Whipsnade Park was opened to the public as the world's first open zoological park.

In 1960–61, Lord Zuckerman, then Secretary of ZSL, raised funds from two medical foundations to found laboratories as an Institute of Zoology where scientists would be employed by ZSL and undertake research.

The Society is a registered charity under English law.

The Institute of Zoology

The Institute of Zoology is the scientific research division of the ZSL. It is a government-funded research institute, which specialises in scientific issues relevant to the conservation of species and their habitats. The Institute of Zoology focuses its research on five areas: evolutionary biology, genetics, ecology, reproductive biology and wildlife epidemiology. The Institute of Zoology was graded 4 in the 1997–2001 UK Research Assessment Exercise, and publishes reports annually. From the late 1980s the Institute of Zoology had been affiliated to the University of London. However, in 2000 this was replaced with a partnership with the University of Cambridge.

Zoos and publications

ZSL runs ZSL London Zoo, ZSL Whipsnade Zoo and had planned to open an aquarium, Biota!.  The society published the Zoological Record (ZR) from 1864 to 1980, when the ZR was transferred to BIOSIS. The Society has published the Proceedings of the Zoological Society of London, now called the Journal of Zoology, since 1830. Since 1998 it has also published Animal Conservation. Other publications include the International Zoo Yearbook and Remote Sensing in Ecology and Conservation.

Awards
The society administers the following award programmes:

 Frink Medal
 Stamford Raffles Award
 Silver Medal
 ZSL Scientific Medal
 Marsh Award for Conservation Biology
 Marsh Award for Marine and Freshwater Conservation
 Thomson Reuters/Zoological Record Award for Communicating Zoology
 Prince Philip Award and Marsh Prize
 Charles Darwin Award and Marsh Prize
 Thomas Henry Huxley Award and Marsh Prize
 the Landseer Medal

Fellows

Individuals can be elected Fellows of the Zoological Society of London and therefore granted the post-nominal letters FZS.

Honorary Fellows
The ZSL's Honorary Fellows include:

1975: Jean Anthony, Jean Dorst
1977: Prince Philip, Duke of Edinburgh
1984: Ernst Mayr
1988: Milton Thiago de Mello
1990: Knut Schmidt-Nielsen
1991: Emperor Akihito of Japan
1992: Edward O. Wilson
1996: John Maynard Smith
1997: Miriam Rothschild
1998: Sir David Attenborough
1999: Sir Robert May
2001: Patrick Bateson
2002: Robert McNeill Alexander, CBE, FRS
2002: William G. Conway
2003: Brian Follett
2004: Sir Martin Holdgate
2005: Sir John Krebs, Katherine Ralls, Sir Brian Heap
2006: Sir John Lawton
2007: John Beddington
2011: Lord Moser
2012: Desmond Morris
2013: Ken Sims

Council
The council is the governing body of the ZSL. There are 15 council members, led by the president and served by the secretary and treasurer. Council members are the trustees of the society and serve for up to five years at a time.

Presidents
The Presidency is a voluntary position, with the role of leading the ZSL Council. The Society's Presidents and their dates in office are:
Sir Stamford Raffles (1826)
Henry Petty-Fitzmaurice, 3rd Marquess of Lansdowne (1827–1831)
Edward Smith-Stanley, 13th Earl of Derby (1831–1851)
Prince Albert, Prince Consort (1851–1862)
Sir George Clerk, Bt (1862–1868)
Arthur Hay, 9th Marquess of Tweeddale (1868–1878)
Sir William H. Flower (1879–1899)
Herbrand Russell, 11th Duke of Bedford (1899–1936)
Richard Onslow, 5th Earl of Onslow (1936–1942)
Henry Gascoyne Maurice (1942–1948)
Edward Cavendish, 10th Duke of Devonshire (1948–1950)
Alan Brooke, 1st Viscount Alanbrooke (1950–1954)
Sir Landsborough Thomson (1954–1960)
Prince Philip, Duke of Edinburgh (1960–1977)
Solly Zuckerman, Baron Zuckerman (1977–1984)
Sir William MacGregor Henderson (1984–1989)
Avrion Mitchison (1989–1992)
Field Marshal Sir John Chapple (1992–1994)
Sir Martin Holdgate (1994–2004)
Professor Sir Patrick Bateson (2004–2014)
Professor Sir John Beddington, CMG, FRS (2014–2022)
Professor Sir Jim Smith FRS (2022-Present)

Secretaries

The post of secretary is honorary and under the society's constitution carries the responsibility for the day-to-day management of the affairs of the ZSL. The secretaries and their dates in office are:

Nicholas Aylward Vigors (1826–1833)
Edward Turner Bennett (1833–1836)
William Yarrell (1836–1838)
John Barlow (1838–1840)
William Ogilby (1840–1847)
David William Mitchell (1847–1859)
Philip Lutley Sclater (1859–1902)
William Lutley Sclater (1903)
Peter Chalmers Mitchell (1903–1935)
Julian Huxley (1935–1942)
Sheffield Airey Neave (1942–1952)
Anthony Chaplin, 3rd Viscount Chaplin (1952–1955)
Solly Zuckerman, Baron Zuckerman (1955–1977)
Ronald Henderson Hedley (1977–1980)
Erasmus Darwin Barlow (1980–1982)
John Guest Phillips (1982–1984)
Richard M. Laws (1984–1988)
Barry Albert Cross (1988–1992)
Professor Robert McNeill Alexander, CBE, FRS (1992–1999)
Paul H. Harvey (2000–2011)
Professor Geoffrey Boxshall, FRS (2011–2021)
Professor Sir Jim Smith FRS (2021-2022)

Coat of Arms

Notes

External links
 Official website

 Bennett, Edward Turner (1830–31) The gardens and menagerie of the Zoological Society..., two volumes

 
Zoological societies
Learned societies of the United Kingdom
Biology societies
1826 establishments in England
Scientific organizations established in 1826
Scientific organisations based in the United Kingdom
Charities based in London
Nature conservation organisations based in the United Kingdom